Zojoi is a video game software development company based in Charlottesville, Virginia.  It was founded by former ICOM Simulations developers David Marsh and Karl Roelofs in 2012.  Zojoi currently has the rights to many of the intellectual properties that once belonged to ICOM Simulations, including Sherlock Holmes: Consulting Detective and Shadowgate.

History 

Zojoi was established on March 7, 2012, with the Commonwealth of Virginia State Corporation Commission.  The company is led by former ICOM Simulations developers David Marsh and Karl Roelofs who worked on the MacVenture series of games and created Shadowgate.  Zojoi's website states that the company is devoted to bringing the original games of ICOM Simulations' intellectual properties to many gaming platforms, as well as new games based on the original IPs.

Zojois first game releases were the first three Sherlock Holmes: Consulting Detective mysteries on iOS, PC, and Mac. In August 2014 the company released a new and enhanced version of Shadowgate for iOS, Android, PC, and Mac devices In an interview with GameSpot during the production process, David Marsh said that Shadowgate would include new rooms and puzzles and a user friendly interface for accessing the player's inventory and a map for navigating around Castle Shadowgate.

Games

See also 
 MacVenture
 Sherlock Holmes: Consulting Detective - A gamebook series originally published by Sleuth Publications

References

External links 
Zojoi Homepage

American companies established in 2012
Software companies based in Virginia
Video game companies of the United States